A Place on Earth may refer to:

 A Place on Earth (2001 film), a Russian film
 A Place on Earth (2013 film), a French / Belgian drama film
 A Place on Earth: The Greatest Hits, 1999 album by Belinda Carlisle
 A Place on Earth (novel), by Wendell Berry

See also 
 Place on Earth, a Danish musician trio